Events from the year 1209 in Ireland.

Incumbent
Lord: John

Events
 Easter Monday – Black Monday: A group of 500 settlers recently arrived in Dublin from Bristol are massacred without warning by warriors of the Gaelic O'Byrne clan near a wood at Ranelagh.

References

 
1200s in Ireland
Ireland
Years of the 13th century in Ireland